Ebenezer Ghansah (born 5 May 1959) is a British taekwondo practitioner. He competed in the men's finweight at the 1988 Summer Olympics.

References

External links
 
 

1959 births
Place of birth unknown
Living people
British male taekwondo practitioners
Olympic taekwondo practitioners of Great Britain
Taekwondo practitioners at the 1988 Summer Olympics
20th-century British people